The H.W. Gates Funeral Home is a historical landmark in Kansas City, Kansas, United States, that is listed on the National Register of Historic Places (NRNP).

Description
The building is located at 1901 Olathe Bouelevard and was established in the mid-1890s by Horatio W. and Mary Gates. That Gates family was among the first licensed embalmers in the state, and they built this Neoclassical-style funeral home in 1922 to house their growing business. Designed by Architect Fred S. Wilson in 1922, it served as the Gates family residence as well as their place of business. The -story building was built in the Neoclassical style. The Gates Funeral Home was run by three generations over almost 100 years in the Rosedale neighborhood of Kansas City.

See also

 National Register of Historic Places listings in Wyandotte County, Kansas

References

External links

 Kansas City Public Library
 Kansas State Historical Society
 National Register of Historic Places Registration Form
 National Register of Historical Places Listings

Buildings and structures in Kansas City, Kansas
Neoclassical architecture in Kansas
Houses completed in 1922
Houses on the National Register of Historic Places in Kansas
Commercial buildings on the National Register of Historic Places in Kansas
Houses in Wyandotte County, Kansas
National Register of Historic Places in Kansas City, Kansas
Death care companies of the United States